Golmud CPV Solar Park is a 138 MWp (~110 MWAC)  concentrator photovoltaics power station located near Golmud City in Haixi Prefecture, Qinghai Province, China.  It is the largest operating CPV facility in the world, and was constructed in two phases by Suncore Photovoltaics starting in 2012.  It is situated at an elevation of about 2,800 meters (9,200 ft) on the Tibetan plateau near the Gobi Desert with several other conventional photovoltaic power stations.

Facility details

The park includes the 270 acre 57.96 MWp Golmud 1 unit located 7 km south of the airport, and the 370 acre 79.83 MWp Golmud 2 unit located about 27 km east.  Golmud 1 consists of 2300 dual-axis Suncore CPV-Gen3.5 solar tracking systems divided into 100 sections.  Golmud 2 consists of 3168 systems divided into 120 sections. For the majority of sections at both units, there are 23 systems connected in parallel to a central grid-connected 500 kW Growatt inverter. For a fifth of sections at the second unit, 40 systems are connected to a central 1 MW Chint inverter.

Each system supports 56 DDM-1090X CPV modules which are each rated to produce 450 Wp.  Each module contains 15 fresnel lenses to concentrate sunlight 1090 times onto approximately 1 cm2 multi-junction solar cells, allowing 28% module efficiency which is greater than other photovoltaic power plants.

The Gen3.5 tracker system is especially notable for its tilt and roll design,  which is unique among the trackers used by other CPV vendors.   The same system is utilized at the 1.21 MWp Eubank Landfill Solar Array in New Mexico, and at the 1.26 MWp  Evora Landfill facility in Portugal.

Electricity production

A study of electricity production conducted over an 18-month period following commissioning of Golmud 1 in September 2013 showed performance at both units stabilizing within about 10% of expectations relative to measured DNI.   The authors' data over the final 12-month period is reproduced from their graphs in the tables below, and also shows production when including their suggested 0-15% correction for system optimization activities during the first several months of operation.  This result extrapolates to combined annual production at both facilities of about 175 GW·h.   The authors' also note that the DNI measurements during the study period were generally 20%-30% lower than historical and regional DNI, a trend they speculated to be caused by a known recent increase in the level of airborne particulates in the Golmud locality.

See also
 Huanghe Hydropower Golmud Solar Park
 Qinghai Golmud Solar Park
 Solar power in China
 Renewable energy in China

References

External links
 VIDEO: Golmud Plant in Operation
 Suncore Brochure 

Buildings and structures in Qinghai
 
Photovoltaic power stations in China
Science and technology in the People's Republic of China